Maltby is an English surname. Notable people with the surname include:

 Brough Maltby (1826–1894), English archdeacon
 Christopher Maltby (1891–1980), British army officer
 David Maltby (1920–1943), British bomber pilot
 Edward Maltby (1770–1859), English bishop
 H.F. Maltby (1880–1963), British actor and writer
 Jasper A. Maltby (1826–1867), American army general
 John Maltby (1936–2020), British painter and ceramics maker
 Judith Maltby (born 1957), American priest and church historian
 Kirk Maltby (born 1972), Canadian ice hockey player
 Lauren Maltby (born 1984), American actress and psychologist
 Margaret Eliza Maltby (1860–1944), American physicist
 Peg Maltby (1899–1984), English-born Australian book illustrator and children's writer
 Richard Maltby, Sr. (1914–1991), American musician and bandleader
 Richard Maltby, Jr. (born 1937), American theatre director and lyricist
 Thomas Maltby (1890–1976), Australian politician 

English-language surnames